The Baku International Tourism Film Festival, is an international film festival in Azerbaijan. It is a non-profit cultural event that takes place every year. The first edition of the Festival was held in 20–24 November 2013, at the Nizami Cinema Center in Baku. The official languages of the festival are Azerbaijani and English.

References

Film festivals in Azerbaijan
Film festivals established in 2013
Autumn events in Azerbaijan
2013 establishments in Azerbaijan
Culture in Baku